Innovation: The European Journal of Social Science Research is a quarterly peer-reviewed academic journal published by Taylor & Francis on behalf of the European Association for the Advancement of the Social Sciences, a non-profit research organization registered in Vienna. The  editors are Ronald J. Pohoryles and Hans-Liudger Dienel.

The journal’s main focus is on the sociology of management, innovation, sustainability and urban planning; it also publishes papers of general sociology and political science from a European perspective.

According to the Journal Citation Reports, in 2021 the journal has a two-year impact factor of 2.541, ranking it 59 out of 148 journals in the category "Sociology".

References 

Routledge academic journals
English-language journals
Publications established in 1988
Quarterly journals
Sociology journals